Mufulira District is a district of Zambia, located in Copperbelt Province. The capital lies at Mufulira. As of the 2000 Zambian Census, the district had a population of 143,930 people. It is divided into three constituencies, namely Mufulira, Kantanshi and Kankoyo.

References

 
Districts of Copperbelt Province